Mydin Mohamed Holdings Berhad (MYDIN) is Malaysia's largest homegrown Halal hypermarket and retail chain.

MYDIN was founded in August 1957 by the late Tuan Mydin Mohamed in Kota Bharu, Kelantan. The first shop was a small wooden shop in Jalan Tok Hakim, Kota Bharu namely Syarikat Mydin Mohamed started the business by selling toys and general goods.

With the help of his children, he expanded the business in Kuala Terengganu in 1979 and later marked a step further by the opening of its first branch in Klang Valley at Jalan Masjid India in 1989.

With the company vision to become the world's leading distributor of competitive Halal Goods and Services, the company has then grown tremendously to present day.

In 2013, MYDIN ventured premium retail with the opening of the SAM'S Groceria; the words SAM's stands for Saya Anak Malaysia.

To date, MYDIN has 65 branches nationwide including 28 MYDIN Supermarkets, 17 MYDIN Emporium, 3 MYDIN Bazaars, 3 MYDIN Mart franchises, 5 convenience stores operating as MyMart, 7 MYDIN supermarket and 2 premium stores known as SAM’S Grocery.

List of stores

This is a list of Mydin stores around Malaysia as of May 2021. Note that Emporiums and Mydin Mart are operated as a wholesale supermarket also but are not located at retail mall buildings.

See also

 List of hypermarkets in Malaysia

References

External links

 

1957 establishments in Malaya
Hypermarkets
Retail companies established in 1957
Supermarkets of Malaysia
Privately held companies of Malaysia